Lycamobile is a British mobile virtual network operator (MVNO) operating in 60 countries. The brand is active in Australia, Austria, Belgium, Denmark, France, Germany, Ireland, Italy, the Netherlands, North Macedonia, Norway, Poland, Portugal, Romania, Russia,South Africa, Spain, Sweden, Switzerland, Tunisia, Uganda, Ukraine, the United Kingdom and the United States. The bulk of Lycamobile revenue is claimed to be generated from its SIM products. Lycatel, also a part of Lyca Group, targets customers within expatriate and ethnic markets that want to make international calls.

Lycamobile sells international pay-as-you-go SIM. Being an MVNO, Lycamobile leases radio frequencies from mobile phone network operators and forms partnerships with the operators in each country it serves. Lycamobile has also developed distinct business structures such as MVNA aggregator arrangements in different countries.In 2015, Lycamobile renewed a multi-year MVNO deal with O2.

The Lycamobile brand concept was launched in 2005 with the first trading using the brand taking place in 2006. Its business structure is arranged to have local national private companies branded under licence as "Lycamobile" and operating exclusively in the particular country as either a MVNO provider or as the principal wholesaler of Lycamobile-branded products.

Since its launch in the Netherlands in 2006, Lycamobile has reached more than 15 million pay-as-you-go customers worldwide.

In 2016, nearly twenty Lycamobile employees were arrested in France, with about half of them charged with money laundering. As of 2020, Lycamobile  is involved in three major tax disputes with HM Revenue and Customs.

Operations
The company currently operates in 23 countries around the world. Lycamobile has previously offered services in Hong Kong since April 2015, but its services were suspended from 6 April 2018.

Reception
In 2015, PC Magazines mobile analyst advised US customers to "take a look at some of the smaller virtual carriers which may offer better customer service or more customized plans" such as Lycamobile.

Ratings and reviews
As of 25 July 2015, the Better Business Bureau stated that due to Lycamobile's failure to respond to 28 of 47 complaints, Lycamobile's rating with the BBB is an F (on a scale of A+ to F).

Other Lyca telecommunications businesses
While Lycamobile represents the core business of Lyca, namely the offering of a MVNO telecommunications services, Lyca has other telecommunication services provided to consumers:

GT Mobile
GT Mobile (also known as "Gnanam Telecom") is a MNVO sub-brand of Lycamobile that operates in Denmark, Germany, The Netherlands, Sweden, Australia, Spain, Italy, France, Belgium and Switzerland (the United Kingdom arm has been merged in Lycamobile). The brand, like its parent, is aimed at those who wish to make national and international phone calls on a pay-as-you-go basis. The GT Mobile brand offers alternative pricing structures and packages focusing more on national bundles from the Lycamobile brand.

Lycatel calling cards
Lycatel is focused on the sale of calling cards to wholesalers to then sell on to the public. Lycatel offers online sales of calling cards and direct customer sales through the Lycateleshop. The Lycatel brand is not itself used as a calling card brand name, but acts as a parent brand name used on various branded calling cards. The most popular brands of Lycatel calling cards include Africa Tel, Cobra, Eurocity, One+One, Spicy Tel, Supertel, Unitel, Viper and World Call. Each calling card brand features different calling rates to different destinations with some being more suited to single use (known in the calling card industry as 'throw-away cards'). Others are more suited to occasional use but will feature a higher standard rate for each call placed. Whilst there is a fair level of confusion between pricing, Lycatel's underlying charges are significantly less than connecting international calls in a conventional sense.

The Lycatel (or as previously used "Lyca Tel") brand has been in existence since 2001 although its early ownership and operational structure were significantly distinct in the early 2000s from the present day. The present-day Lycatel brand owners and licensees form a larger organisation although the operational focus of Lycatel remains the sale of a variety of differently branded calling cards to wholesalers. Wholesalers in turn sell onto retailers who then sell primarily to expatriate customers who want to make low-cost international calls.

Lycatel primarily operates via its own national reselling companies or through its service providers in Australia, Austria, Belgium, Canada, Denmark, France, India (an outsourcing operation), Ireland, Italy, Netherlands, Norway, Portugal, Romania, Spain, Sweden, Switzerland, United Kingdom, United States and Tunisia.

Lycatel currently holds a wider country-by-country spread than the Lycamobile operations, although Lycamobile has begun operations in countries where Lycatel does not currently have a presence, such as Poland. Although the calling card market is generally considered to be in decline with the arrival of mobile telephony, Lycatel as a whole remains a dominant and significant competitor in the calling card market in Europe.

Lycatalk
The Lycatalk brand is also part of the Lyca family of brands and operates in the same jurisdictions as the calling card brands with the exception of Portugal. Lycatalk has less prominence than the Lycatel and Lycamobile brands but has a simply structured product with no set up fees or other maintenance charges. Lycatalk tariff rates are more settled and rarely vary wildly, unlike more aggressively price structured products such as calling cards.

Lycachat
Lycachat is a voice over IP (voIP) offering available to consumers. Lycachat benefits from the Lycamobile infrastructure and should be able to provide connection to traditional telephone networks at virtually no cost to the consumer.

Other businesses
Aside from telecommunications, there are a variety of Lyca-branded business ventures. Services range from financial products and insurance services, as well as ventures into logistics and even an airline business Lyca Airways, based in West Africa. Ventures of note include the following:

Lycamoney
Lycamoney is a pre-paid debit card offering, enabling mainly new migrants to European countries to have access to payment schemes such as MasterCard.

Lyca Radio
Launched in 2013, Lyca Radio was born after the acquisition by Lyca of radio frequencies previously operated by Sunrise Radio. Lyca offers two stations, Lyca Radio and Lyca Gold. Both stations have retained the previous format of Sunrise Radio, targeting South Asian communities. This is also in part because of regulatory requirements imposed by Ofcom.

DilSe radio took over the 1035 AM radio band used by Sunrise's Kismat Radio. Programming includes Bollywood music, and special programming for ramadan.

Lyca Productions

Lyca Productions is an India-based film production venture. Lyca produced India's most expensive film, 2.0, at a budget of US$75 million; it was scheduled for release on 29 November 2018.

LycaFly
LycaFly is the travel arm of the Lyca business, and specialises in offering cheap flights and holidays to predominantly Asian destinations such as India and Sri Lanka as well Nigeria. LycaFly was launched in 2007 as part of an acquisition of an existing travel agency business. The UK LycaFly business, U Can Fly Limited, is owned by Pettigo Comércio Internacional, Limitada, a Portuguese holding company located in Madeira, Portugal.  Pettigo Comércio Internacional, Limitada also owns the LycaFly brand name. At present LycaFly operates only in the UK.

Lycaremit
Lycaremit, launched in 2015 is the one of the newest ventures from the Lycagroup which acts as a money transfer service which allows users to send money abroad.

LycaTV
Lyca TV is an online over-the-top (OTT) ethnic entertainment provider, currently available in 20 countries and in 09 languages. The service, launched in 2015, is mainly targeted at major expat communities spread across the world.

Lycalotto
Lycalotto, launched in March 2017, is a lottery syndicate platform available in the UK and Ireland. Lycalotto offers access to lottery draws from around the world, including those not normally accessible in the region such as the US Powerball.

Controversies
On 5 May 2016, Lycamobile Ireland Limited was found guilty of the offence of failing to comply with a request for information made by the Commission for Communications Regulation ComReg using its statutory information gathering powers. The company was found guilty in the Dublin District Court and fined €3000 and ordered to pay a contribution towards ComReg's costs.

The information requested was in connection with ComReg's ongoing review of the wholesale local access (‘WLA’) and wholesale central access (‘WCA’) markets which facilitate the provision of wholesale and retail fixed telephony, broadband and other services.

T-Mobile in the United Kingdom charged its customers exclusive of their minutes allowance for calls to United Kingdom Lycamobile/GT Mobile numbers, despite Lycamobile UK being headquartered in London, and using United Kingdom "07"-prefixed numbers issued by Ofcom, in the UK. By contrast, Lycamobile UK did not treat calls to UK T-Mobile customers any differently and calls were charged just as any "07" UK mobile telephone numbers.

In June 2016, Lycamobile in France was under investigation by authorities for tax fraud and money laundering offences. Lycamobile has contested the allegations.

Lycamobile has not paid any corporation tax for several years in the United Kingdom though the company put aside £9.5 million to cover "a potential liability of unpaid taxes" including "interest and penalties" in its 2015 accounts. Lycamobile's 2015 accounts were filed seven months late, appearing after Companies House threatened to strike Lycamobile off; such an action would have prevented the company from conducting business in the UK. Lycamobile had previously been threatened with being struck off in 2012; its accounts were filed two years late that year. Some suggest it is because Lycamobile is a significant donor to the British Conservative Party, having donated £1.3 million since 2011, including £500,000 in 2015. They also donated use of a call centre to Boris Johnson during his 2012 London mayoral election campaign.

As of February 2023, Lycamobile's auditors state they have been "unable to obtain sufficient appropriate audit evidence" regarding loans of £18 million, and there is a further £169 million of complex debt within related companies. Lycamobile faces a £100 million demand over alleged VAT irregularities.

References

External links

Mobile virtual network operators
Telecommunications companies established in 2006
Mobile phone companies of North Macedonia
Telecommunications companies of North Macedonia
Lyca Productions